Thomas Eliel Fenwick Blackburn (10 February 1916 – 13 August 1977) was a British poet. His work is noted for its self-examination and spiritual imagery. His memoir, A Clip of Steel (1969), portrays the effects of a childhood under a repressive clergyman father.

Early life
Blackburn was born in Hensingham, Cumberland, England. He had mixed ancestry. His father, Eliel, was the product of an affair his missionary grandfather had with a Mauritian woman. The mother, who was supposedly beautiful but unstable, disappeared once she returned to Mauritius and the young Eliel was given to the care of an Uncle, where he was brought up to be a passionate Anglican. When Thomas Blackburn was a young boy, Eliel forced him to wear a painful chastity contraption on his groin, to prevent him from being tempted by masturbation. He also had to put up with his father, haunted by feelings of racial inferiority, repeatedly scrubbing his face with peroxide in order to lighten his complexion. The poet Alan Morrison, discussing this experience, noted that 'Blackburn' is 'a cruelly apt surname for someone whose father used to literally try to burn the black off his skin'.

He studied law at Selwyn College, Cambridge – which he did not enjoy – at the insistence of his father. He made himself unpopular with some of the students after socialising and partying with two visiting black musicians he had invited into halls. Numerous incidents of misbehaviour, culminating in the discovery of a contraceptive in his room, saw him expelled from college during his third year. This was followed by a short spell as an articled clerk at a law firm; then Brookfield Hall, a treatment centre for alcoholics and drug-addicts, where he was expelled for drunkenly attempting to seduce the wife of one of the medical staff; and finally several months of shock therapy at the hands of a Harley Street doctor. He completed a course in psychology at Birkbeck, University of London, before going on to study English at Durham University (Hatfield College) – the same institution his father had studied theology.

On graduating from Durham in June 1940, he moved down to London and became involved with the Soho literary scene. Here he was called up to the Merchant Navy but left after suffering jaundice and instead worked as a lecturer with the National Fire Service, which proved to be his first steps into the world of teaching.

Career

From 1945 Blackburn worked in a succession of schools across London and at King's School, Rochester. In 1954 he became English Master at Marylebone Grammar School.

He held a Gregory Fellowship in poetry at the University of Leeds between 1956 and 1958. He had been nominated for the position by his predecessor, John Heath-Stubbs, and agreed to take the role once he had been approached by the Leeds academic Bonamy Dobrée. These were apparently two of the busier years of his life, with Blackburn throwing himself into university and student activities: he edited an undergraduate poetry journal, Poetry and Audience; held regular poetry sessions at his home in Headingley, sometimes with the participation of his friends and fellow poets Michael Hamburger and George Barker; and helped produce the Leeds University Verse anthology. During his time in Leeds he also developed a close friendship with the literary critic G. Wilson Knight. However, this period was also marred by the breakdown of his marriage with the painter, Rosalie de Meric. At the end of his fellowship he returned to being a teacher in Marylebone.

Blackburn taught at the College of St. Mark and St. John in Chelsea, London, as well as other educational institutions. He eventually became head of the English department at St. Mark and St. John. In 1973, when the college decided to move to Plymouth, he decided he would rather stay in London and soon found a job at Whitelands College (now part of the University of Roehampton), retiring in early 1976.

In 1969 Blackburn published A Clip of Steel, a memoir of his childhood and early adulthood – republished in 2014 by Valancourt Books. This book was followed two years later by The Feast of the Wolf, a novel inspired by the vampire myth, which is again back in print. Blackburn also published a collection of critical essays and a monograph on Robert Browning.

Personal life
He was married three times; with his second wife Rosalie he had a daughter, Julia Blackburn, born in 1948. During the marriage he was regularly violent and, on the birth of Julia, became a frequently absent parent returning home drunk after many infidelities which he did not keep secret.  Rosalie was described in Julia’s memoir as sexually prolific, though it is suggested this occurred before and then after the end of the marriage to Blackburn, often boasting of her many partners.  Blackburn was also an alcoholic and suffered several mental breakdowns during his life. He died from a cerebral haemorrhage at his cottage in Snowdonia as he was getting into bed, immediately after finishing a letter to his brother John.

See also
 List of Hatfield College alumni
 List of Durham University people

References

External links
 Archival material at 

1916 births
1977 deaths
Academics of the University of Leeds
Alumni of Selwyn College, Cambridge
Alumni of Hatfield College, Durham
Alumni of Birkbeck, University of London
English people of Mauritian descent
20th-century English poets
British Merchant Navy personnel of World War II
Civil Defence Service personnel